5α-Dihydroprogesterone (5α-DHP, allopregnanedione, or 5α-pregnane-3,20-dione) is an endogenous progestogen and neurosteroid that is synthesized from progesterone. It is also an intermediate in the synthesis of allopregnanolone and isopregnanolone from progesterone.

5α-DHP is metabolized by the aldo-keto reductases (AKRs) AKR1C1, AKR1C2, and AKR1C4 with high catalytic efficiency. AKR1C1 preferentially forms 20α-hydroxy-5α-pregnane-3-one while AKR1C2 preferentially forms allopregnanolone. Similarly AKR1C1 reduces and consequently inactivates allopregnanolone into 5α-pregnane-3α,20α-diol. In contrast to the other AKRs, AKR1C3 has low catalytic efficiency for reduction of 5α-DHP. These AKRs are highly expressed in the human liver and mammary gland but have relatively modest expression in the human brain and uterus.

5α-DHP is an agonist of the progesterone receptor and a positive allosteric modulator of the GABAA receptor (albeit with an affinity for this receptor that is regarded as relatively low (in comparison to 3α-hydroxylated progesterone metabolites such as allopregnanolone and pregnanolone)). It has also been found to act as a negative allosteric modulator of the GABAA-rho receptor. The steroid has been found to possess 82% of the affinity of progesterone for the progesterone receptor in rhesus monkey uterus. 5α-Dihydroprogesterone has been said to possess about 33% of the relative progestogenic potency of progesterone. In addition, it is a weak agonist of the pregnane X receptor (PXR) (EC50 >10,000 μM), with approximately six-fold lower potency relative to its 5β-isomer, 5β-dihydroprogesterone.

Allopregnanolone is transformed back into 5α-DHP by 3α-hydroxysteroid oxidoreductase, and conversion of allopregnanolone into 5α-DHP is responsible for the progestogenic activity of allopregnanolone. 5α-DHP, via the progesterone receptor, and allopregnanolone, via the GABAA receptor, act together to induce lordosis in animals. A study found that 41% of allopregnanolone that was administered via injection was transformed into 5α-DHP in the rat brain.

Levels of 5α-DHP have been quantified.

Chemistry

See also
 3α-Dihydroprogesterone
 Epipregnanolone
 3β-Dihydroprogesterone
 Allopregnanediol

References

Neurosteroids
Progestogens
GABAA receptor positive allosteric modulators
GABAA-rho receptor negative allosteric modulators
Pregnane X receptor agonists
Diketones
Pregnanes
5α-Pregnanes